This is a list of notable schools in the African country of Tunisia.

Primary and secondary schools
Primary schools and secondary schools in Tunisia include:

 American Cooperative School of Tunis, La Goulette
 The British International School of Tunis, La Soukra
 École Canadienne de Tunis, Tunis
 Farhat Hached High School, Radès 
 Grombalia High School, Grombalia
 International School of Carthage, Carthage
 Canopus International School of Tunis (CIST), Charguia 1
 Istituto Scolastico Italiano "Giovan Battista Hodierna", Tunis
 Kheireddine Tunisian International School, Tunis
 Lycée Pierre Mendès France, Tunis
 Pioneer School of Ariana, Aryanah
 Pioneer School of Gafsa, Gafsa
 Sadiki College, Tunis
 Taïeb Mhiri School, Tunis
 Al Jomhouriya Avenue Elementary School, Ezzahra

Tertiary schools

See also

 Education in Tunisia
 Lists of schools

Schools
Schools
Tunisia
Tunisia

Schools